Alberto Pedro Spencer Herrera (6 December 1937 – 3 November 2006) was an Ecuadorian footballer who played as a forward, and is widely regarded as one of the best Ecuadorian footballers of all time He is probably best known for his still-standing record for scoring the most goals in the Copa Libertadores, the most important club tournament in South America. He was elected the 20th best South American footballer of the 20th century in a poll by the IFFHS in 2004. He was known as "" (Spanish for magic head).

Biography
Born in Ancón, Santa Elena, Ecuador, Spencer was the son of a Jamaican of British origin.

He was an ambidextrous striker with lethal pace, off-the-ball movement, heading and balance skills, and excellent finishing that tore defences to shreds for over a decade. After his retirement in 1973, he lived in Montevideo, Uruguay. In 1982, he was appointed consul of Ecuador in Uruguay.

Spencer suffered a heart attack on 13 September 2006 during a routine checkup with his cardiologist. He died on 3 November 2006 in the Cleveland Clinic in Cleveland, Ohio, United States. His lineage survives through his Chilean wife María Teresa, his children Alberto, Walter, Jacqueline, and his grandchildren.

Career
Alberto Spencer began his career at age 15 playing for Everest. He jumped to fame when he was scouted while playing on loan for Barcelona SC against Peñarol in July 1959. Peñarol's manager, Hugo Bagnulo, asked his scout 'Pibe' Ortega to attempt to sign him after the game was over. He was soon transferred to Peñarol where he amassed three Libertadores Cups and two Intercontinental Cups, as well as several Uruguayan league titles. After his second Intercontinental Cup, he was twice sought by Inter, but ultimately Peñarol's board would not sell him.

On the international front, Spencer holds the unique distinction of being the only goalscorer, capped by two different countries simultaneously: Ecuador, and Uruguay. He 'switched' shirts no less than four times. He played for Uruguay against England (2-1) in a friendly match at the legendary Wembley Stadium and scored, making him the first Ecuadorian-born player to score in that stadium.

His name was omitted from FIFA's, and Pelé's list of 100 greatest living players. This caused outrage among many South American journalists who believed greats like Spencer, were being ignored in favour of commercialism. David Mellor of the Evening Standard notably blasted FIFA in his reporting of the incident.

Although widely considered one of the best South American players of all time, he still remains largely an unknown figure in Europe. This is presumably because he never participated in a World Cup or played in Europe. Similar fates awaited other greats such as Alfredo Di Stéfano (who, while called up for the 1962 tournament, did not play due to injury) and George Best, though both are far more known due to their domestic careers with Real Madrid and Manchester United respectively.

He was elected the 20th South America Player of the Century in a poll by the IFFHS in 2004.

Achievements
Spencer still maintains the South American club record in Copa Libertadores, with his tally of 54 goals between 1960 and 1972, playing for Everest of Guayaquil, Barcelona of Guayaquil, and Peñarol (Uruguay). During that period, he walked away as winner of the competition three times (1960, 1961, and 1966, all of them playing for Peñarol) and was winner of the Intercontinental Cup twice, beating Eusebio's Benfica and Real Madrid, and was runner-up once. In fact, his Intercontinental goal tally is only one goal behind the all-time record of his more famous contemporary, Pelé.

Spencer was also four times the leading scorer of Uruguay's League with Peñarol, helping them to win the Uruguayan championship eight times during his 12-year stay. Throughout his professional career, he scored a grand total of 450 goals, surpassing 500 if friendlies were taken into account.

Honours

Club
Peñarol

Primera División: 8
 1959, 1960, 1961, 1962, 1964, 1965, 1967, 1968

Copa Libertadores: 3
 1960, 1961, 1966

Intercontinental Cup: 2
 1961, 1966

Supercopa de Campeones Intercontinentales: 1
 1969

Barcelona

Serie A: 1
 1971

Individual 
Copa Libertadores top scorer: 2
 1960, 1962.
Primera División top scorer: 4
 1961, 1962, 1967, 1968.
 RSSSF - Ecuador: Player of the century.
 IFFHS: 20th best South American player in the century.

References

External links
 Alberto Spencer: el Caballero, el Diplomático, el Goleador 
 International Herald Tribune obituary
 Alberto Pedro Spencer's Matches and Goals in Copa Libertadores
 
 
 

1937 births
2006 deaths
People from Santa Elena Province
Ecuadorian people of Jamaican descent
Ecuadorian people of British descent
Association football forwards
Ecuadorian footballers
Uruguayan footballers
C.D. Everest footballers
Peñarol players
Barcelona S.C. footballers
Copa Libertadores-winning players
Uruguayan Primera División players
Uruguay international footballers
Ecuador international footballers
Expatriate footballers in Uruguay
Dual internationalists (football)
Uruguayan people of Ecuadorian descent
Sportspeople of Ecuadorian descent
Uruguayan people of British descent
Uruguayan people of Caribbean descent
C.D. Universidad Católica del Ecuador managers